Head Entertainment was an entertainment retail chain in the United Kingdom. The company was formed on 18 February 2009 when Simon Douglas, former managing director of Zavvi and business partner Les Whitfield, purchased five stores from Zavvi Entertainment Group which was placed in administration on 24 December 2008. All stores closed in early 2010 after less than a year of trading.

History

Virgin Megastores 

Richard Branson started his first Virgin store on London's Oxford Street in 1971. In 1979, the company opened their first Megastore at the end of Oxford Street and Tottenham Court Road. Between the 1980s and 1990s, the chain grew, most notably through its merger with Our Price whilst under the ownership of WH Smith. By the 1990s Virgin Megastores had become an international franchise as part of the Virgin Group. During the early to mid 2000s Virgin Group decided to sell off most of its Virgin Megastores to various companies, including the French stores to the Lagardere Group and the American stores to Related Companies.

Zavvi 

In September 2007 it was announced that the UK arm of the Virgin Megastores brand was to break away from the Virgin Group, in a management buy-out offer led by managing director Simon Douglas and finance director Steve Peckham.

EUK, of the Woolworths Group, was the main supplier of Zavvi under an exclusive supply deal. As a result of EUK entering into administration, on 24 December 2008, the entertainment retailer was also forced into administration as it was unable to source stock on favourable terms direct from suppliers. As a result of its administration Zavvi closed the majority of its 130 stores, with some sold to rival HMV, and some others to a new company, Head Entertainment.

Head Entertainment 
Head Entertainment was formed on 2 February 2009 by Simon Douglas, former managing director of Zavvi, Mark Noonan, former Director of Trading of Zavvi and their business partner Les Whitfield. Les Whitfield also founded the entertainment retailer Impulse which he sold in July 2007.

On 18 February, the day in which the final set of store closures was announced, Zavvi's administrators Ernst & Young sold 14 of the stores to HMV, and five to Head Entertainment. An additional two stores were purchased on 20 February 2009. A third additional store, the former Zavvi store at The Mall, Cribbs Causeway in Bristol was also going to be purchased, but the company was unable to reach an agreement with the landlord. The store was subsequently taken over by HMV who relocated from their former premises at Cribbs Causeway and employed some of the former Zavvi staff. All of the remaining stock which Zavvi owned was sold to Head Entertainment. It is thought that the partners in Head paid less than 20p a unit for the Zavvi stock.

Product range 
Head Entertainment sold a range of products from Audio, Books, CDs, Computer software and hardware, DVDs and Video Games; a similar product mix to the stores it replaced (Zavvi, and previously Virgin Megastores). Much of the stock retailed in Head Entertainment stores was ex-Zavvi stock.

Operations and decline 
Head Entertainment operated stores in Bristol Broadmead, Dundee, Leeds, Merry Hill, Bluewater, Manchester Arndale Centre, Cardiff and Liverpool One. They were all former Zavvi outlets.

In December 2009 the company started a closing down sale in all stores. By 10 January 2010, the only remaining Head Stores were Bristol and Dundee (leases extended through 2011) with Merryhill's lease until Easter 2010. The Head store in Leeds closed on 10 January 2010. 

The remaining stores stocked a limited music chart, while new DVD releases came in the form of unused rental copies. Game stock was nominal and no clothing was sold within these stores.

The Bristol store closed on 27 March 2010, but reopened a week later as a Head Records store. Under Head Records, the store traded until January 2016.

See also 
 The Hut Group
 Zavvi Entertainment Group Ltd

References

External links 
Head, Belfast Facebook page

Music retailers of the United Kingdom
Retail companies established in 2009
Retail companies disestablished in 2010
Defunct retail companies of the United Kingdom
2009 establishments in England
2010 disestablishments in England